Vanj (also transliterated as Vandzh, Vanch) is a village and jamoat in Gorno-Badakhshan Autonomous Region, Tajikistan. It is the seat of the Vanj District. Vanj lies on the lower course of the river Vanj, a tributary of the Panj, separated from the Yazgulem to the south by the Vanj Range. The jamoat, which is also called Abdulloev, has a total population of 11,217 (2015).

References 

Populated places in Gorno-Badakhshan